The 1926–27 French Rugby Union Championship of first division was won by Toulouse  that beat Stade Français in the final.

Le Stade Toulousain conquest his fifth Bouclier de Brennus in six year.

Context 
The 1927 Five Nations Championship was won by Ireland and by Scotland, the France was last.

First round

The first two of each pool admitted to next round.

It was assigned 3 points for victory, 2 for draw, 1 for lost match, 0 point in case of forfeit.

 Pool A :  Lézignan 11 pts Albi 10 pts Toulon7 pts Angoulême  6 pts Dax 6 pts,
 Pool B :  Béziers 10 pts Libourne 10 pts Agen 9 pts Soustons 7 pts Cavaillon 4 pts
 Pool C : Pau 12 pts SA Bordeaux 10 pts Montferrand8 pts Toulouse Olymp.EC 6 pts Brive 4 pts
 Pool D :  Stade Français 12 pts Stadoceste 10 pts SBUC 8 pts Biarritz  6 pts Périgueux4 pts
 Pool E :  Carcassonne 10 pts  Grenoble 10 pts Hendaye 10 pts Pamiers 6 pts CASG 4 pts
Tie-Break: Grenoble – Hendaye 12–10
 Pool F :  Toulouse12 pts US Perpignan 10 pts Begles 8 pts Limoges 6 pts Villeneuve 4 pts
 Pool G : Cognac 11 pts Narbonne 8 pts Lourdes 8 pts Montauban 7 pts Bayonne 6 pts
Tie-Break: Narbonne  Lourdes 6–3
 Pool H :  Quillan 12 ptsRacing 8 pts Lyon OU 8 pts Mazamet 6 pts Boucau 6 pts
Tie-Break: :Racing  – Lyon OU 19 – 6

Second round

The winner of each group admitted to semifinals

 Pool A :  Toulouse 8 pts Carcassonne8 pts Racing Paris 5 pts UA Libourne 3 pts Tie-Break: :Toulouse  – AS Carcassonne 6–0
 Pool B : Pau 9 pts  Stadoceste 7 pts Albi 5 pts Béziers 3 pts
 Pool C :  SA Bordeaux' 8 pts US Perpignan 7 pts Cognac 5 pts Quillan 4 pts
 Pool D : Stade Français 7 pts Lézignan 7 pts Narbonne 7 pts Grenoble 3 pts  Tie-Break:  Stade Français.- Narbonne 10 a 8  Stade Français-  FC Lézignan 11 a 5

Semifinals

Final

External links
 Compte rendu de la finale de 1927, sur lnr.fr

1927
1926–27 rugby union tournaments for clubs
Championship